The chestnut-bellied euphonia (Euphonia pectoralis) is a species of bird in the family Fringillidae. It was formerly placed with the related Thraupidae.  It is found in Argentina, Brazil, and Paraguay. Its natural habitats are subtropical or tropical moist lowland forest and subtropical or tropical moist montane forest.

The black-throated euphonia ("Euphonia vittata") is now thought to be a hybrid between the chestnut-bellied euphonia and the orange-bellied euphonia.

References

chestnut-bellied euphonia
Birds of Brazil
Birds of the Atlantic Forest
chestnut-bellied euphonia
Taxonomy articles created by Polbot